Jane Porter (later Jane Clayton, Lady Greystoke) is a fictional character in Edgar Rice Burroughs's series of Tarzan novels and in adaptations of the saga to other media, particularly film.  Jane, from Baltimore, Maryland, is the daughter of professor Archimedes Q. Porter. She becomes the love interest and later the wife of Tarzan, and subsequently the mother of their son Korak. She develops over the course of the series from a conventional damsel in distress, who must be rescued from various perils, to an educated, competent and capable adventuress in her own right, fully capable of defending herself and surviving on her own in the jungles of Africa.

In the novels 
Jane first appeared in the initial Tarzan novel Tarzan of the Apes (1912) then later reappeared in:

 The Return of Tarzan (1913)
 The Beasts of Tarzan (1914)
 The Son of Tarzan (1914)
 Tarzan and the Jewels of Opar (1916)
 Tarzan the Untamed (1920)
 Tarzan the Terrible (1921)
 Tarzan and the Golden Lion (1923)
 Tarzan and the Ant Men (1924)
 Tarzan's Quest (1936)
 Tarzan the Magnificent (1939)

Jane also appeared in a minor role in the non-Tarzan novel The Eternal Lover (1925), the events of which take place chronologically between The Return of Tarzan and The Beasts of Tarzan.

Jane is described in Tarzan of the Apes as a beautiful, young woman, with long, blonde hair. She is between 18 and 20 years old in the novel.

In addition, Porter is the narrator-protagonist in Jane: The Woman Who Loved Tarzan by Robin Maxwell, a 2011 novel authorized by Edgar Rice Burroughs, Inc. to commemorate the centennial celebration of Tarzan. Maxwell's novel is a free adaptation of the original story, contradicting it on numerous points of the story.

In other media

Film 
Early Tarzan films portrayed Jane Porter and (occasionally) her father faithfully to the portrayal in the novels. The 1932 sound film Tarzan the Ape Man and its sequels changed the character's name to Jane Parker, portraying her as English rather than American and making her and Tarzan the adoptive parents of an orphan they named "Boy". In addition, the name of Jane's father in the first film is James Parker. Remakes of the 1932 film, (Tarzan, the Ape Man (1959) and Tarzan, the Ape Man (1981)) reprised this portrayal as well as that of her father. Maureen O'Sullivan, who portrayed Jane Parker with Johnny Weissmuller in the 1932 film and its first few sequels, was the most famous screen Jane.

In recent Tarzan films, starting with Greystoke: The Legend of Tarzan, Lord of the Apes (1984), the character is again Jane Porter, and her father Archimedes Q. Porter, and both once again Americans (with the exception of Disney's 1999 animated Tarzan, which again represents both as English). Jane Porter was once the ninth princess in the Disney Princess franchise but later removed. She permanently was replaced by Tiana from The Princess and the Frog. 

Actresses who portrayed Jane on film include:
 Enid Markey 1918 (Elmo Lincoln as Tarzan)
 Karla Schramm 1920 (Gene Pollar as Tarzan; P. Dempsey Tabler as Tarzan)
 Louise Lorraine 1921 (Elmo Lincoln as Tarzan)
 Dorothy Dunbar 1927 (James H. Pierce as Tarzan)
 Natalie Kingston 1929 (Frank Merrill as Tarzan)
 Maureen O'Sullivan 1932–1942 (Johnny Weissmuller as Tarzan)
 Brenda Joyce 1945–1949 (Johnny Weissmuller as Tarzan; Lex Barker as Tarzan)
 Vanessa Brown 1950 (Lex Barker as Tarzan)
 Virginia Huston 1951 (Lex Barker as Tarzan)
 Dorothy Hart 1952 (Lex Barker as Tarzan)
 Joyce MacKenzie 1953 (Lex Barker as Tarzan)
 Eve Brent 1958 (Gordon Scott as Tarzan)
 Joanna Barnes 1959 (Denny Miller as Tarzan)
 Bo Derek 1981 (Miles O'Keeffe as Tarzan)
 Andie MacDowell 1984 (Christopher Lambert as Tarzan)
 Jane March 1998 (Casper Van Dien as Tarzan)
 Minnie Driver 1999 (voice – Disney's animated Tarzan) (Tony Goldwyn as the voice of Tarzan)
 Olivia d'Abo 2002, 2001–2003 (voice – Disney's direct-to-video sequel, and the TV series) (Michael T. Weiss as the voice of Tarzan)
 Spencer Locke 2013 (voice – Constantin Film's CGI Tarzan) (Kellan Lutz as Tarzan)
 Margot Robbie 2016 (Alexander Skarsgård as Tarzan)

The Jane character is absent in:
 Tarzan Triumphs (1943)
 Tarzan's Desert Mystery (1943)
 Tarzan's Hidden Jungle (1955)
 Tarzan and the Lost Safari (1957)
 Tarzan's Greatest Adventure (1959)
 Tarzan the Magnificent (1960)
 Tarzan Goes to India (1962)
 Tarzan's Three Challenges (1963)
 Tarzan and the Valley of Gold (1966)
 Tarzan and the Great River (1967)
 Tarzan and the Jungle Boy (1968)

Jane in all but name 
Three Tarzan films presented female leads who became the partner of Tarzan, but who were not named Jane, for one reason or another.

 Tarzan the Mighty (1928), starring Frank Merrill. Natalie Kingston portrays Mary Trevor, who becomes Tarzan's mate at film's end. A year later Kingston portrayed Jane to Merrill's Tarzan in Tarzan the Tiger.
 Tarzan the Fearless (1933), starring Buster Crabbe. Jacqueline Wells portrays Mary Brooks, who becomes Tarzan's mate at film's end.
 Tarzan's Revenge (1938), starring Glenn Morris. Eleanor Holm portrays Eleanor Reed, who becomes Tarzan's mate at film's end. Producer Sol Lesser nixed calling the character Jane as he felt that Holm was so popular for her swimming exploits that audiences would not accept her playing a character not named Eleanor.

Television 
The Jane character has appeared sporadically in the seven (to date) television series featuring Tarzan, occasionally in offbeat portrayals when she does appear.

She was entirely omitted in television series Tarzan (1966–68).

In the Filmation animated series Tarzan, Lord of the Jungle (1976–80), she appeared once in the episode "Tarzan and Jane," in which she and her father were part of an archaeological expedition looking for the lost city of Cowloon; she was voiced by Linda Gary in this episode.

In the TV movie Tarzan in Manhattan (1989) the character was reimagined as a New York cab driver, played by Kim Crosby, and in the French-Canadian-Mexican series Tarzán (1991–94) as a French ecologist, played by Lydie Denier.

Jane was absent from Tarzan: The Epic Adventures (1996–1997), and Lydie Denier returned in the role of Olga de Coude; Jane was slated to appear in the unproduced second season, with Julie St. Claire cast in the role.

Olivia d'Abo took the role in the Disney animated series The Legend of Tarzan (2000–2003), a follow-up to Disney's animated Tarzan film and its direct-to-video sequel Tarzan & Jane (2002).

The 2003 series Tarzan, set like Tarzan in Manhattan in New York City, casts Sarah Wayne Callies as detective Jane Porter.

In the CGI 2017 series Tarzan and Jane, Jane Porter is a teenage, big-city girl who becomes friends with a teenage Tarzan.

Actresses who portrayed Jane on television include:

 Linda Gary 1979 (voice, with Robert Ridgely as the voice of Tarzan)
 Kim Crosby 1989 (Joe Lara as Tarzan)
 Lydie Denier 1991–1994 (Wolf Larson as Tarzan)
 Olivia d'Abo 2000–2003 (voice, with Michael T. Weiss as the voice of Tarzan)
 Sarah Wayne Callies 2003 (Travis Fimmel as Tarzan)
 Rebecca Shoichet 2017 (voice) (Giles Panton as Tarzan)

Radio 
 Joan Burroughs Pierce 1932–1934

Stage 
 Ethel Dwyer 1921 (Broadway)
 Jennifer Gambatese 2006 (Disney's Broadway Musical)

Audio cassette 
 1999 Minnie Driver (with Naia Kelly playing "narrator" Jane)

Video games 
 Naia Kelly 2001–2002 (voice – Tarzan Untamed and Kingdom Hearts) (Tony Goldwyn as the voice of Tarzan)

References 
 

Tarzan characters
Literary characters introduced in 1912
Fictional characters from Baltimore
Fictional English people
Fictional Central African people
Fictional artists
Fictional viscounts and viscountesses
Fictional counts and countesses
Fictional anthropologists
Fictional explorers
Fictional sole survivors
Jungle girls
Dynamite Entertainment characters
Fantasy film characters
Female characters in literature
Female characters in comics
Female characters in film